The Deadwood River is a  tributary of the South Fork Payette River, flowing through Boise National Forest in Valley and Boise counties, Idaho in the United States. The source of the Deadwood River is below the Deadwood summit on forest road 579 in the Salmon River Mountains. The Deadwood Dam was completed in 1931 and impounded the river to form Deadwood Reservoir.

References

Rivers of Idaho
Rivers of Custer County, Idaho